Fire Power is an ongoing comic book series created by Robert Kirkman and Chris Samnee, published monthly by Image Comics as of August 2020.

Publication history
Fire Power was first announced in December 2019. The series was originally intended to be published with an original graphic novel (OGN) prelude in April 2020, followed by a free first issue in May as a part of 2020's Free Comic Book Day (FCBD). The idea was that the free first issue would result in customers buying the Prelude OGN. This was a concept Kirkman came up with after discussing with comic store owners about ways to make Free Comic Book Day better for them. However, due to the impact of the COVID-19 pandemic and the cancelation of FCBD, these plans had to change. The FCBD issue was rebranded as the Fire Power #1 promotional edition and released on the same day as the Prelude OGN in early July. The standard edition of Fire Power #1 came out in August, containing special features not included in the promotional edition.

Kirkman and Samnee are working well ahead of schedule on the series. In a July 2020 interview, Kirkman mentioned that the first twelve issues were already complete, some of which are extended beyond standard length.

Plot summary
Series synopsis courtesy of Image Comics:
"The one who wields the fire power is destined to save the world, but Owen Johnson has turned his back on that life. He doesn't want the power—he never did. He only wants to spend time with his family and live his life, but unseen forces are at work to make that impossible. Danger lurks around every corner as Owen's past comes back to haunt him."

Reception and sales

Collected editions

References

Comics
Series of books
Image Comics titles
2020 comics debuts